Ng Sui (born 28 August 1980) is a Hong Kong diver. He competed in the men's 10 metre platform event at the 1996 Summer Olympics.

References

External links
 

1980 births
Living people
Hong Kong male divers
Olympic divers of Hong Kong
Divers at the 1996 Summer Olympics
Place of birth missing (living people)
Divers at the 1998 Asian Games
Asian Games competitors for Hong Kong